Norman François Yellowlees (March 17, 1912 – October 14, 1991) was a two-sport athlete from Manitoba. As a Canadian ice hockey centre, he won the 1935 World Hockey championship with the Winnipeg Senior Monarchs in Davos, Switzerland. He played soccer for the Winnipeg Manitoba Telephones.

Awards and achievements
Turnbull Cup MJHL Championship (1931)
Memorial Cup Championship (1931)
IIHF World Championship (1935)
“Honoured Member” of the Manitoba Hockey Hall of Fame

External links
Norm Yellowlees’s biography at Manitoba Hockey Hall of Fame

1912 births
1991 deaths
Canadian ice hockey centres
Soccer players from Winnipeg
Ice hockey people from Winnipeg
Winnipeg Monarchs players
Canadian soccer players
Association footballers not categorized by position